Elachista sicula is a moth of the family Elachistidae. It is found on Sicily.

The larvae feed on Briza maxima, Bromus erectus and Lagurus ovatus. They mine the leaves of their host plant.

References

sicula
Moths described in 1978
Endemic fauna of Italy
Moths of Europe